Gabriele Perthes (born 20 January 1948) is a German swimmer. Born in Dessau, Soviet Occupied Zone, she competed in the 1968 Summer Olympics for East Germany.

In 1968, Gabriele Perthes competed in the preliminary heats of the women's  freestyle relay, along with swimmer Uta Schmuck, Roswitha Krause, and Gabriele Wetzko. The team won a silver medal in final.

External links 

1948 births
Living people
East German female swimmers
Olympic swimmers of East Germany
Swimmers at the 1968 Summer Olympics
East German female freestyle swimmers